Seitendorf may refer to the following places:

in the Czech Republic:
Seitendorf, the German name for Hladké Životice, a village in Nový Jičín District
Seitendorf, the German name for Horní Životice, a village in Bruntál District
Seitendorf bei Neutitschein, the German name for Životice u Nového Jičína, a village in Nový Jičín District

in Poland:
Seitendorf, the German name for Gniewoszów, Lower Silesian Voivodeship, a village in Kłodzko County
Seitendorf, the German name for Mysłów, Lower Silesian Voivodeship, a village in Jawor County

in Slovenia:
Seitendorf, the German name for Stranska Vas ob Višnjici, a village in Lower Carniola
Seitendorf, the German name for Stranska Vas pri Semiču, a village in Lower Carniola